Eccleshill is a ward in the metropolitan borough of the City of Bradford, West Yorkshire, England.  It contains 30 listed buildings that are recorded in the National Heritage List for England.  All the listed buildings are designated at Grade II, the lowest of the three grades, which is applied to "buildings of national importance and special interest".  The ward is to the northeast of the centre of Bradford, and contains the former village of Eccleshill and the surrounding area, including the districts of Fagley and Greengates.  Most of the listed buildings are houses, cottages and associated structures, farmhouses and farm buildings.  The other listed buildings consist of a former chapel, a church, and a former mechanics' institute.


Buildings

References

Citations

Sources

 

Lists of listed buildings in West Yorkshire
Listed